The following table shows the fourteen tallest buildings in Boise, Idaho. The tallest building in Boise and the state of Idaho since 2013 is the 8th & Main Building at 18 floors and 323 feet (278 feet without the spire) in height.

Tallest under construction, approved and proposed 
This lists buildings that are under construction, approved, and proposed in Boise and are planned to rise at least 50 meters (164 ft).

References

External links
Idaho State Historical Society Reference Series – #672, Boise building chronology, (1983)
Emporis.com – Boise's tallest buildings - Top 20

Buildings and structures in Boise, Idaho
Boise
Tallest